Monticelli d'Ongina is a comune (municipality) in the Province of Piacenza in the Italian region Emilia-Romagna, located about  northwest of Bologna and about  east of Piacenza.

Monticelli d'Ongina borders the following municipalities: Caorso, Castelnuovo Bocca d'Adda, Castelvetro Piacentino, Cremona, Crotta d'Adda, San Pietro in Cerro, Spinadesco, Villanova sull'Arda.

Sights include the rocca (a 15th-century fortress built by Rolando Pallavicino), now housing an ethnographical museum, and the Abbey Basilica.

Natives of Monticelli d'Ongina include the composer Amilcare Zanella.

References

Cities and towns in Emilia-Romagna